

Shmuel Winograd (January 4, 1936 – March 25, 2019) was an Israeli-American computer scientist, noted for his contributions to computational complexity. He has proved several major results regarding the computational aspects of arithmetic; his contributions include the Coppersmith–Winograd algorithm and an algorithm for the fast Fourier transform.

Winograd studied Electrical Engineering at the Massachusetts Institute of Technology, receiving his B.S. and M.S. degrees in 1959. He received his Ph.D. from the Courant Institute of Mathematical Sciences at New York University in 1968. He joined the research staff at IBM in 1961, eventually becoming director of the Mathematical Sciences Department there from 1970 to 1974 and 1980 to 1994.

Honors
IBM Fellow (1972)
Fellow of the Institute of Electrical and Electronics Engineers (1974)
W. Wallace McDowell Award (1974)
Member, National Academy of Sciences (1978)
Member, American Academy of Arts and Sciences (1983)
Member, American Philosophical Society (1989)
Fellow of the Association for Computing Machinery (1994)

Books

References

1936 births
2019 deaths
Theoretical computer scientists
Fellows of the Association for Computing Machinery
Fellow Members of the IEEE
Fellows of the Society for Industrial and Applied Mathematics
Members of the United States National Academy of Sciences
IBM Research computer scientists
IBM employees
IBM Fellows
Courant Institute of Mathematical Sciences alumni
MIT School of Engineering alumni
Members of the American Philosophical Society